Davide Antonio Xausa (born 10 March 1976) is a Canadian former soccer player.

Club career
Xausa started his career with Metro Ford Wolves before accepting a scholarship with the University of Portland where he was a 3 time All American, 4 time WCC 1st team pick and 3 time All Far West Region 1st team. After spending three years at the University of Portland, Xausa was chosen to be part of the 1996 Canadian Olympic team. During that qualification Xausa led the Canadian team to final playoff against Australia for a qualification spot. The attempt was unsuccessful but as a result of his play he relocated to Stoke-on-Trent, England in January 1998 to play for Port Vale on trial. Unable to secure a contract he was asked to join their rivals Stoke City the following month. Xausa signed a six-month contract and but he only played once, away at Bury in 1997–98, as then manager Chris Kamara, was sacked for a poor run of form. Xausa's contract expired and he was offered a 2-year contract, moving North to Scotland to sign with St Johnstone. Due to injuries and lack of first team action, Xausa made a move the Netherlands Netherlands to sign with Eerste Divisie side Dordrecht '90. Xausa was part of the successful division playoff with Dordrecht and enjoyed a fruitful spell with the club.

Xausa was offered a return to the United Kingdom in late 1999 and settled in Scotland with Inverness Caledonian Thistle. He played over sixty games for the club, maintaining a respectable goals tally before he was sold to first division rivals Livingston in March 2001. He was cup-tied for Livi's appearance in the semi-finals of the 2000–01 Scottish Cup. Staying with Livingston for two years he made 68 league appearances. During that time the club enjoyed the most successful spell with the team finishing third in the SPL and Xausa starting over 20 games. He struck a formidable partnership with a Spaniard, David Fernandez, and the two became a dangerous combination. Xausa was also part of the UEFA Cup qualification and scored in the homeleg of the second round against Austrian powerhouse Sturm Graz. After another management shift at Livingston in August 2003 he joined Falkirk. He scored his first and what turned out to be only goal for Falkirk in the Scottish Cup against Ayr United but left the club of his own accord in February 2004 to return to his native Canada to play for the Vancouver Whitecaps.

International career
Xausa earned his first cap for Canada on 27 April 1999 against Northern Ireland. In all he played 32 full international games and scored 2 goals – one against Guatemala in a friendly on 29 May 1999 and the other one in the Open Canada Cup against Ecuador on 6 June 1999, which Canada lost 2–1.

In 2000, he was part of Canada's squad that won their first CONCACAF Gold Cup alongside fellow Inverness Caledonian Thistle team-mate, Richard Hastings. He played two games in the 2001 FIFA Confederations Cup. His last national team game was on 18 January 2003 against the United States.

Career statistics

Club
Source:

A.  The "Other" column constitutes appearances and goals in the UEFA cup.

International
Source:

Honours
Livingston
Scottish First Division: 2000–01

References

External links

 (archive)

1976 births
Living people
Soccer players from Vancouver
Canadian people of Italian descent
Canadian soccer players
Canada men's international soccer players
CONCACAF Gold Cup-winning players
2000 CONCACAF Gold Cup players
2001 FIFA Confederations Cup players
2002 CONCACAF Gold Cup players
2003 CONCACAF Gold Cup players
Canadian expatriate soccer players
Canadian expatriate sportspeople in the Netherlands
Portland Pilots men's soccer players
St. Catharines Roma Wolves players
Stoke City F.C. players
St Johnstone F.C. players
FC Dordrecht players
Inverness Caledonian Thistle F.C. players
Livingston F.C. players
Falkirk F.C. players
Vancouver Whitecaps (1986–2010) players
Vancouver Columbus players
Scottish Football League players
Scottish Premier League players
USL First Division players
Eerste Divisie players
Expatriate footballers in England
Expatriate footballers in Scotland
Expatriate footballers in the Netherlands
English Football League players
Canadian National Soccer League players
Association football forwards
Canadian expatriate sportspeople in Scotland
Canadian expatriate sportspeople in England